Kenneth Augustine Hobson (24 October 1957 – 2 December 2006) was a Grenadian cricketer. He played in two first-class and four List A matches for the Windward Islands from 1980 to 1984.

See also
 List of Windward Islands first-class cricketers

References

External links
 

1957 births
2006 deaths
Grenadian cricketers
Windward Islands cricketers